Per Erik Anders Lunqvist (born January 24, 1951) is an ice hockey player who played for the Swedish national team. He won a bronze medal at the 1980 Winter Olympics.

References

External links

1951 births
Living people
Ice hockey players at the 1980 Winter Olympics
Modo Hockey players
Olympic ice hockey players of Sweden
Swedish ice hockey players
Olympic medalists in ice hockey
Olympic bronze medalists for Sweden
Medalists at the 1980 Winter Olympics